Stępina  is a village in the administrative district of Gmina Frysztak, within Strzyżów County, Subcarpathian Voivodeship, in south-eastern Poland.

The village has an approximate population of 920.

World War II

Over the course of the camp's operation some 10,000 people perished, including Soviet prisoners of war, Polish Jews, non-Jewish Poles, as well as Ukrainians and Romani people.

The remains of the camp in Szebnie were entered by the Soviets on 8 September 1944 during counter-offensive of the Red Army.

References

Villages in Strzyżów County
Holocaust locations in Poland